The Sinsinawa River is a  tributary of the Mississippi River. It rises in Grant County, Wisconsin, with headwaters just outside Cuba City, flowing southwards into Jo Daviess County, Illinois, joining the Mississippi a few miles west of Galena.

The river is part of the Driftless Area of Illinois and Wisconsin. This region remained ice free during the last ice age, contributing to the rugged appearance of the river canyon.

The name "Sinsinawa" is associated with Sinsinawa Mound in Grant County, Wisconsin. One version holds that "Sinsinawa" derives from an Algonquian word (possibly Potawatomi, Fox or Menominee language) for "rattlesnake" to describe the Sioux. Another version says "home of the young eagle".

See also
List of Illinois rivers
List of Wisconsin rivers

References

External links
Prairie Rivers Network
USGS Real-Time Stream Gage, Sinsinawa River

Rivers of Illinois
Rivers of Wisconsin
Tributaries of the Mississippi River
Rivers of Jo Daviess County, Illinois
Rivers of Grant County, Wisconsin
Driftless Area

fr:Liste des fleuves de l'Illinois
nl:Lijst van rivieren in Illinois